The Universal Magazine may refer to:

The Universal Magazine of Knowledge and Pleasure (1747–1814), published in London
The Universal Magazine (1900 monthly) (1900–1902), published in London

See also
List of 18th-century British periodicals